This Is My Story: Volume One is a final compilation album by American jazz singer Dinah Washington.

Reception
A reviewer of Dusty Groove stated "A cool compilation that features one album of new recordings of older Dinah Washington hits—done in 1961 with backings by Quincy Jones—and another record that features some of Dinah's best bits for Mercury from the late 50s and early 60s!"

Track listing

References

Mercury Records albums
Dinah Washington albums
1963 albums